Ilya Abramovich Frez (20 August 1909, Roslavl – 22 June 1994, Moscow), PAU, was a Soviet film director primarily known for his films for younger viewers. Among his films was the internationally popular I Loved You of 1967.

Selected filmography
First-Year Student (1948)
Vasyok Trubachyov and His Comrades (1955)
Trubachyov's Detachment Is Fighting (1957)
I Loved You (1967)
Adventures of the Yellow Suitcase (1970)
Crank from 5th B (1970)
We Didn't Learn This (1975)
Could One Imagine? (1981)Quarantine (1983)Personal file of Judge Ivanova'' (1985)

References

1909 births
1994 deaths
Soviet film directors
Soviet Jews
People from Roslavlsky District